Diego Orejuela Rodríguez (born 20 January 1962) is a Spanish retired footballer who played as a midfielder.

Football career
Born in La Luisiana, Province of Seville, Orejuela made his professional debuts with RCD Español, being an undisputed starter since age 21 after serving four loans in the lower leagues, all in Catalonia, and remaining as such for the following six years. He scored three goals in the Pericos' 1987–88 runner-up campaign in the UEFA Cup, having also captained the team for a number of years.

After a last weak season in La Liga – just 12 games, only two complete – Orejuela retired also in the area in 1993, playing two years with Español neighbours Palamós CF in the second division.

Personal life
Orejuela's older brother, Jesús, was also a professional footballer. A striker, he represented in the top level Espanyol (coinciding with Diego from 1982 to 1984), CA Osasuna and Real Zaragoza.

Their cousin, Antonio, also played the sport. A midfielder, he appeared mainly for RCD Mallorca and Atlético Madrid.

References

External links

Espanyol archives 

1962 births
Living people
People from Écija (comarca)
Sportspeople from the Province of Seville
Spanish footballers
Footballers from Andalusia
Association football midfielders
La Liga players
Segunda División players
Segunda División B players
Tercera División players
RCD Espanyol footballers
UE Figueres footballers
CE Sabadell FC footballers
UE Lleida players
Palamós CF footballers
Spain youth international footballers
Spain under-21 international footballers
Spain amateur international footballers
Catalonia international footballers